Ifat may refer to:

 Sultanate of Ifat, a Muslim sultanate in the northern Horn of Africa

 Yifat (Ethiopia), a historical and traditional province of Shewa in the Amhara region of Ethiopia
 Indirect fluorescent antibody technique, a diagnostic process employing secondary immunofluorescence
 International Fair Trade Association, the original name of the World Fair Trade Organization

See also
 Yifag, a town in Kemekem, Amhara, Ethiopia
 Yifat, a kibbutz in Israel